The 2021 Korean Mixed Doubles Curling Championships, Korea's national mixed doubles curling championships, was held July 27 to August 9, 2021 at the Jincheon National Training Centre in Jincheon, South Korea. The winning team will be the Korean National Mixed Doubles Team for the 2021–22 curling season. They will represent South Korea at the Olympic Qualification Event in hopes of reaching the 2022 Winter Olympics in Beijing, China and the 2021 World Mixed Doubles Qualification Event, attempting to reach the 2022 World Mixed Doubles Curling Championship. The championship was be held in two rounds.

Summary
Due to a rule change in eligibility that allowed men's and women's teams to compete in the mixed doubles discipline, over fifty teams registered in this years championship, a huge increase from the five that competed in 2020. After the qualifiers, the field was narrowed down to just thirty-one teams, and thirty once one team had to drop out. Like the men's and women's championships, the event was scheduled to be held in three rounds. The first round was held in a triple-knockout bracket, which qualified eight teams for the playoffs and the second round. Kim Min-ji and Lee Ki-jeong (Gangwon A) won the first round, qualifying through the A Event and going undefeated en route to winning the round. They defeated Jang Yeong-seo and Jeong Byeong-jin (Seoul Federation), who had also qualified through the A-side 10–0 in the final. Two C Event qualifiers made up the third place game, with Shin Ga-yeong and Park Jun-ha (Jeonbuk B) winning the game 10–3 over reigning mixed doubles champions Kim Ji-yoon and Moon Si-woo (Gyeonggi D). Kim Su-ji and Kim Jeong-min (Gyeonggi C), Yang Tae-i and Lee Ki-bok (Gangwon C), Um Min-ji and Nam Yoon-ho (Jeonbuk A) and Kim Hye-rin and Seong Yu-jin (Gangwon B) all advanced to the second round as well. Round 2 was held in a round robin between the eight qualifying teams. Through the second round, Kim Min-ji and Lee Ki-jeong dominated the field, winning all seven of their games. This meant that no third round was needed as Kim and Lee had won both the first and second round, scoring all ten available points. Yang Tae-i and Lee Ki-bok finished second through the round with a 5–2 record, earning themselves four points. As they had gotten one point from the first round, they finished the tournament with five points, which was tied with Seoul Federation and Gyeonggi D in second place. However, due to Kim and Moon having the worst Draw Shot Challenge of the three teams, they finished in fourth. Gangwon C and Seoul Federation then played a second place game to determine the national team backup, with the team from Seoul coming away as 6–5 winners. Shin Ga-yeong and Park Jun-ha finished in fifth place with four points, followed by Um Min-ji and Nam Yoon-ho in sixth with three points and Kim Hye-rin and Seong Yu-jin tied with Kim Su-ji and Kim Jeong-min in seventh with eight points.

Medalists

Format
Due to a rule change in eligibility, everyone who competed at the 2021 Korean Curling Championships was also eligible to compete in the mixed doubles national championship. A series of qualifiers from different regions of Korea were held to narrow the field down from over fifty teams to just thirty teams. The first round is open to all teams that qualified through their regional qualifiers and the second round is open to the eight teams that made the playoffs from the first round. If one team wins both the first and second rounds, then no third round is needed. The third and final round is a best-of-seven series between the winners of rounds one and two to determine the national champion and Olympic representative.

Teams receive points based on their placement in each round. The winner receives five points, the runner-up gets four, third place earns three, fourth place picks up two and the rest of the teams receive one point.

Qualification process

Teams
The teams are listed as follows:

Round 1
The first round of the championship was held from July 27 to August 6. The eight teams that qualified for the playoffs advanced to the second round.

Knockout brackets

Source:

A event

B event

C event

Knockout results
All draw times are listed in Korean Standard Time (UTC+09:00).

Draw 1
Tuesday, July 27, 9:00 am

Draw 2
Tuesday, July 27, 2:00 pm

Draw 3
Tuesday, July 27, 7:00 pm

Draw 4
Wednesday, July 28, 9:00 am

Draw 5
Wednesday, July 28, 2:00 pm

Draw 6
Wednesday, July 28, 7:00 pm

Draw 7
Thursday, July 29, 9:00 am

Draw 8
Thursday, July 29, 2:00 pm

Draw 9
Thursday, July 29, 7:00 pm

Draw 10
Friday, July 30, 9:00 am

Draw 11
Friday, July 30, 2:00 pm

Draw 12
Friday, July 30, 7:00 pm

Draw 13
Saturday, July 31, 9:00 am

Draw 14
Saturday, July 31, 2:00 pm

Draw 15
Saturday, July 31, 7:00 pm

Draw 16
Sunday, August 1, 9:00 am

Draw 17
Sunday, August 1, 2:00 pm

Draw 18
Sunday, August 1, 7:00 pm

Draw 19
Monday, August 2, 9:00 am

Draw 20
Monday, August 2, 2:00 pm

Draw 21
Monday, August 2, 7:00 pm

Draw 22
Tuesday, August 3, 9:00 am

Draw 23
Tuesday, August 3, 2:00 pm

Draw 24
Tuesday, August 3, 7:00 pm

Draw 25
Wednesday, August 4, 9:00 am

Draw 26
Wednesday, August 4, 7:00 pm

Playoffs

Quarterfinals
Thursday, August 5, 9:00 am

Semifinals
Thursday, August 5, 5:00 pm

Bronze medal game
Friday, August 6, 10:00 am

Gold medal game
Friday, August 6, 10:00 am

Points standings

Round 2
The second round of the championship is currently being held from August 6 to 9. As Round 1 champions Kim Min-ji and Lee Ki-jeong won the round, no third round was needed.

Round-robin standings
Final round-robin standings

{|
|valign=top width=10%|

Round-robin results
All draw times are listed in Korean Standard Time (UTC+09:00).

Draw 1
Friday, August 6, 5:00 pm

Draw 2
Saturday, August 7, 9:00 am

Draw 3
Saturday, August 7, 2:30 pm

Draw 4
Saturday, August 7, 8:00 pm

Draw 5
Sunday, August 8, 9:00 am

Draw 6
Sunday, August 8, 2:30 am

Draw 7
Monday, August 9, 9:00 am

Points standings

Playoff

Second place game
Monday, August 9, 2:30 pm

Qualification

Gyeonggi Qualifier
July 10–19, Uijeongbu Curling Stadium, Uijeongbu

Teams
The teams are listed as follows:

Round-robin standings
Final round-robin standings

Round-robin results
All draw times are listed in Korean Standard Time (UTC+09:00).

Draw 1
Saturday, July 10, 9:00 am

Draw 2
Saturday, July 10, 1:00 pm

Draw 3
Saturday, July 10, 4:30 pm

Draw 4
Monday, July 12, 1:00 pm

Draw 5
Monday, July 12, 8:00 pm

Draw 6
Tuesday, July 13, 1:00 pm

Draw 7
Tuesday, July 13, 8:00 pm

Draw 8
Wednesday, July 14, 8:00 pm

Draw 9
Thursday, July 15, 4:00 pm

Draw 10
Thursday, July 15, 7:30 pm

Draw 11
Friday, July 16, 4:30 pm

Draw 12
Friday, July 16, 7:30 pm

Draw 13
Saturday, July 17, 9:00 am

Draw 14
Saturday, July 17, 1:00 pm

Draw 15
Saturday, July 17, 4:30 pm

Tiebreakers
Monday, July 19, 4:30 pm

Cheongju Qualifier
July 10–11, Cheongju Curling Stadium, Cheongju

Teams
The teams are listed as follows:

Qualifier results
All draw times are listed in Korean Standard Time (UTC+09:00).

Game 1
Saturday, July 10, 10:00 am

Game 2
Saturday, July 10, 3:00 pm

Game 3
Saturday, July 10, 3:00 pm

Game 4
Sunday, July 11, 3:00 pm

Gangwon Qualifier
July 12–15, Gangneung Curling Centre, Gangneung

Teams
The teams are listed as follows:

Round-robin standings
Final round-robin standings

{|
|valign=top width=10%|

Round-robin results
All draw times are listed in Korean Standard Time (UTC+09:00).

Draw 1
Tuesday, July 13, 10:00 am

Draw 2
Tuesday, July 13, 5:00 pm

Draw 3
Wednesday, July 14, 10:00 am

Draw 4
Wednesday, July 14, 5:00 pm

Draw 5
Thursday, July 15, 10:00 am

Gyeongbuk Qualifier
July 13–16, Uiseong Curling Centre, Uiseong

Teams
The teams are listed as follows:

Round-robin standings
Final round-robin standings

Round-robin results
All draw times are listed in Korean Standard Time (UTC+09:00).

Draw 1
Tuesday, July 13, 2:00 pm

Draw 2
Tuesday, July 13, 5:30 pm

Draw 3
Wednesday, July 14, 9:30 am

Draw 4
Wednesday, July 14, 2:00 pm

Draw 5
Wednesday, July 14, 5:30 pm

Draw 6
Thursday, July 15, 9:30 am

Draw 7
Thursday, July 15, 2:00 pm

Draw 8
Thursday, July 15, 5:30 pm

Draw 9
Friday, July 16, 9:30 am

Draw 10
Friday, July 16, 2:00 pm

Jeonbuk Qualifier
July 16–17, Uiseong Curling Centre, Uiseong

Teams
The teams are listed as follows:

Round-robin standings
After Draw 3

Round-robin results
All draw times are listed in Korean Standard Time (UTC+09:00).

Draw 1
Friday, July 16, 5:30 pm

Draw 2
Saturday, July 17, 9:30 am

Draw 3
Saturday, July 17, 2:30 pm

See also
2021 Korean Curling Championships

Notes

References

External links
Korean Curling Media (@curling1spoon) on Instagram

2021 in curling
Curling at the 2022 Winter Olympics
Sport in North Chungcheong Province
Sport in Gyeonggi Province
Sports competitions in Gangneung
Sport in North Gyeongsang Province
July 2021 sports events in Asia
2021 in South Korean sport